Helzberg Diamonds is a jewelry retailer founded in 1915 by Morris Helzberg that has 210 stores in 36 US states.

Leadership 

In April 2009, Beryl Raff, former executive vice president and general merchandise manager of fine jewelry at JCPenney, was named Chairman and Chief Executive Officer of Helzberg. Raff was succeeded at CEO in 2022 by Brad Hampton.

History 
Soon after Helzberg's founding, Morris Helzberg became ill and the company was taken over by his son, Barnett Helzberg Sr., at the age of 14. In 1963, Barnett Sr. became Chairman of the Board and his son, Barnett Helzberg Jr., took over company operations.
Barnett replaced his father in the Chairman position in 1988. Barnett Jr. sold the company to Berkshire Hathaway, owned by Warren Buffett, in 1995, and authored the book What I Learned Before I Sold to Warren Buffett

In 2017, Helzberg closed several stores, though customers who purchased Lifetime Care warranties are still able to utilize other stores for regular cleanings and inspections, or mail the jewelry to the company's service center.

References

External links 
 Helzberg Diamonds
 Berkshire Hathaway
 Beryl Raff

Berkshire Hathaway
Jewelry retailers of the United States
American companies established in 1915
Retail companies established in 1915
1915 establishments in Kansas